Livia Maria Millhagen (born 23 May 1973) is a Swedish actress.

Millhagen was born in Stockholm and studied at Malmö Theatre Academy 1995–99.  In 1997 she appeared at the Royal Dramatic Theatre in August Strindberg's Fadren, directed by Staffan Valdemar Holm, and she is a regular cast member at that theatre.

Millhagen has also been engaged at Uppsala City Theatre where she has appeared in Birgitta Englin's plays Ur funktion and Elektra. In 2008 Spring she appeared in the play Den allvarsamma leken at Stockholm City Theatre.

Selected filmography
2021 - Young Royals  (TV series)
2002 - Beck – Annonsmannen
2003 - Miffo
2005 - Buss till Italien
2007 - 
2008 - Everlasting Moments
2009 - Oskar, Oskar
2017 - Vilken jävla cirkus
2019 - Fågelfångarens Son (en. The Birdcatcher's Son)
2020 - Bäckström

References

External links

Info about Livia Millhagen (on Polish)
Livia Millhagen on www.dramaten.se

1973 births
Living people
Swedish actresses
Actresses from Stockholm